Emil Dyre (born 9 February 1984) is a retired Danish professional football midfielder. In the 2007-08 season, Dyre played 9 matches for Lyngby BK in the Danish Superliga.

Coaching career
On 8 June 2019 it was confirmed, that Dyre had decided to retire. In January 2020, he was hired as the assistant manager of B.93, the club where he had played 261 games for and fifth most games in the club's history.

References

External links
Career statistics at Danmarks Radio

1984 births
Living people
Danish men's footballers
Boldklubben af 1893 players
Fremad Amager players
Hellerup IK players
Lyngby Boldklub players
Boldklubben Frem players
Danish Superliga players
Danish 2nd Division players
Sportspeople from Frederiksberg
Association football midfielders